Upper Battery is a former artillery battery in the British Overseas Territory of Gibraltar. It was located on the Upper Ridge of the Rock of Gibraltar at a site south of Signal Hill Battery and faced east over the Mediterranean. It mounted two 32-pdrs. in 1861. On the other side of the hill, three 24-pdrs. were mounted at Lower Battery. The two batteries were used for signalling and drill purposes.

The name "Upper Battery" was later used as a generic term for the three batteries mounting Gibraltar's main counter-bombardment guns, at Lord Airey's, O'Hara's and Spur Batteries.

References

Batteries in Gibraltar